This article contains information about the literary events and publications of 1732.

Events
April – The London Magazine is founded in opposition to the pro-Tory Gentlemen's Magazine.
December 7 – The original Theatre Royal, Covent Garden, London (today's Royal Opera House) is opened by John Rich with a production of William Congreve's The Way of the World.
December 13 – The first issue of Then Swänska Argus, by Olof von Dalin, is published in Sweden, introducing the "younger new Swedish" (yngre nysvenska) literary language.
December 28 – The first edition of Poor Richard's Almanack, by Benjamin Franklin, is published in America.
unknown date – Trinity College Library in Dublin, designed by Thomas Burgh, is completed.

New books

Prose
George Berkeley – Alciphron
Johann Jakob Bodmer – translation of John Milton's Paradise Lost into German prose
Elizabeth Boyd – The Happy-Unfortunate
Mary Davys – The False Friend (fiction)
Philip Doddridge – Sermons on the Religious Education of Children
Robert Dodsley – A Muse in Livery
George Granville, Lord Lansdowne – The Genuine Works
Thomas-Simon Gueullette – Les Sultanes de Guzarate, contes mogols (Mogul Tales; or, the Dreams of Men Awake)
John Horsley – Britannia Romana, or The Roman Antiquities of Britain
William King – The Toast
Alain-René Lesage – Les avantures de monsieur Robert Chevalier, dit de Beauchêne, capitaine de flibustiers dans la Nouvelle-France (The Adventures of Robert Chevalier, Call'd de Beauchene, Captain of a Privateer in New-France)
George Lyttelton, 1st Baron Lyttelton – The Progress of Love
Daniel Neal – The History of the Puritans or Protestant Non-Conformists
Richard Savage – An Epistle to the Right Honourable Sir Robert Walpole
Philip Skippon – An Account of a Journey Made Thro ̓ Part of the Low-Countries, Germany, Italy, and France
Jonathan Swift 
The Lady's Dressing Room
The Grand Question Debated
(with Pope and others) Miscellanies: The Third Volume
Isaac Watts – A Short View of the Whole Scripture History
Leonard Welsted – Of Dulness and Scandal (answer to The Dunciad)
Gilbert West – Stowe
Martín Sarmiento – Demostración apologética

Drama

Henry Carey
Amelia (opera)
The Disappointment
Terminta
Henry Fielding
The Lottery
The Modern Husband
The Covent-Garden Tragedy
The Old Debauchees
The Mock Doctor (performed)
John Gay (with Alexander Pope) – Acis and Galatea (opera by Handel)
Charles Johnson – Caelia
 John Kelly – The Married Philosopher
Pierre de Marivaux – The Triumph of Love (Le Triomphe de l'amour)
 James Miller – The Modish Couple
Voltaire – Zaïre

Poetry

Heyat Mahmud – Sarbabhedbāṇī; Bengali
John Milton – Milton's Paradise Lost, edited by Richard Bentley

Births
January 6 – Matija Antun Relković, Croatian grammarian and poet (died 1798)
January 24 – Pierre de Beaumarchais, French writer (died 1799)
February – Charles Churchill, English satirist and poet (died 1764)
February 19 – Richard Cumberland, English dramatist (died 1811)
April – George Colman the Elder, English dramatist and essayist (died 1794)
August 24 – Peter Ernst Wilde, German physician, journalist and printer (died 1785)
September 29 – Samuel Musgrave, English classical scholar and pamphleteer (died 1780)

Deaths
February 13 – Charles-René d'Hozier, French historian (born 1640)
February 22 – Bishop Francis Atterbury, English politician and writer (born 1663)
March 20 – Johann Ernst Hanxleden, German poet and lexicographer (born 1681)
March 29 (buried) – Jane Barker, English dramatist and poet (born 1652)
May 9 – Samuel Palmer, English printer (year of birth unknown)
July 3 (buried) – Mary Davys, Irish poet and dramatist (born 1674)
December 2 – Constantia Grierson, Irish poet and classical scholar (born c. 1705)
December 4 – John Gay, English poet and dramatist (born 1685)
December 22 – Joseph Thurston, English poet (born 1704)

References

 
Years of the 18th century in literature